Joseph Egger (22 February 1889 – 29 August 1966; also spelled Josef Egger) was an Austrian character actor who appeared in 76 films between 1935 and 1965.

Biography
The 18-year-old Egger started his stage career at the Leoben theatre. During the following decades, he also appeared at the Raimund Theater in Vienna and at the Deutsches Theater in Munich. Besides acting Egger was a well-known music hall comedian, and he was famous for doing "tricks" with his beard. He received his first film offers during the 1930s and specialized on portraying eccentric old men in supporting roles. During the 1950s, he appeared in comedic roles in numerous Austrian Heimatfilms of that era. Internationally, Egger appeared as a character actor in the first two films of the Sergio Leone western "Dollars Trilogy": As the coffin-builder in A Fistful of Dollars (1964) and as Prophet in his final film appearance For a Few Dollars More (1965).

Personal life
Joseph Egger was married and had three sons. He worked as an actor until his death in 1966 at the age of 77.

Selected filmography

 Im weißen Rößl (1935)
 Der König lächelt – Paris lacht (1936)
 Mädchenpensionat (1936)
 Das jüngste Gericht (1940)
 Love is Duty Free (1941)
 Reisebekanntschaft (1943) – Postbote
 Black on White (1943) – Man on Public Park Bench Calling for His Dog (uncredited)
 Schrammeln (1944) – Pfändungsbeamter
 Die goldene Fessel (1944)
 Music in Salzburg (1944) – Parkwächter
 Die Fledermaus (1946) – Frosch The Jailer
 Der Hofrat Geiger (1947) – Der alte Windischgruber
 Der Herr Kanzleirat (1948) – Briefträger 
 Die Verjüngungskur (1948) – Vinzenz, Vater von Hinterhuber 
  (1950)
 Child of the Danube (1950) – Christoph
 No Sin on the Alpine Pastures (1950) – Der Großvater
 Wedding Night In Paradise (1950) – Biangetti, Portier
 Gruß und Kuß aus der Wachau (1950) – Adalbert Kürenberg
 Wedding in the Hay (1951) – Ferdinand Hauderer
 Spring on Ice (1951) – Ober im Weinlokal
 Der Fünfminutenvater (1951) – Gendarm
  (1951)
  (1951)
 Eva erbt das Paradies... ein Abenteuer im Salzkammergut (1951) – Alois Wegrichter
 Tanz ins Glück (1951) – Heinz Falkenhayn
 Valentins Sündenfall (1951) – Blasius Rogner
 In München steht ein Hofbräuhaus (1951) – Petiti
 The Mine Foreman (1952) – Praxmarer, Obersteiger aus Hallstatt
 Die Wirtin von Maria Wörth (1952) – Briefträger Seppl
  (1952)
 Dark Clouds Over the Dachstein (1953)
 The Singing Hotel (1953) – Wurmser, Hotelportier
 A Night in Venice (1953) – Barbuccio
 Die Perle von Tokay (1954) – Janek, Offiziersdiener
 Consul Strotthoff (1954)
 Columbus Discovers Kraehwinkel (1954)
 Swelling Melodies (1955) – Gefängniswärter Frosch
 The Inn on the Lahn (1955) –  Zimperl
 Royal Hunt in Ischl (1955)
 Das Erbe vom Pruggerhof (1956) – Kerstl, Pruggers Kutscher
 Bademeister Spargel (1956) – Ypsilon
 Die gestohlene Hose (1956)
 Love, Summer and Music (1956)
 Die Fischerin vom Bodensee (1956) – Großvater Grassl
 Liebe, Sommer und Musik (1956) – Alois Rinnerthaler, der großvater
  (1956) – Stieglbauer
 Sissi – The Young Empress (1956) – Ceremony Master Nepalek
 The Old Forester House (1956) – Josef Kramer
  (1957) – Älterer Saaldiener 
 Hoch droben auf dem Berg (1957) – Joseph Hinteregger
 Der Bauerndoktor von Bayrischzell (1957) – (uncredited)
 Siebenmal in der Woche (1957) – Praxl
 Weißer Holunder (1957) – Draxltoni
 Der schönste Tag meines Lebens (1957) – Blümel
 Heimweh … dort, wo die Blumen blühn (1957) – Josef
 Almenrausch and Edelweiss (1957) – Förster Fenninger
  (1958) – Franz Lechner, Franzis Großvater
 When She Starts, Look Out (1958) – Onkel Tobias 
 Christine (1958) – (uncredited)
 Mikosch of the Secret Service (1959) – Oberst Wedel – Geheimdienst-Chef
 Sooo nicht, meine Herren! (1960) – Friedensrichter
 Hohe Tannen (1960)
 The White Horse Inn (1960) – (uncredited)
  (1961)
  (1961) – Franz Joseph, Portier
 Forever My Love (1962) – (uncredited)
 Dance with Me Into the Morning (1962) – Kapitän Zebel 
 Die lustigen Vagabunden (1962) – Tankwart Fuchsteufel
 The Model Boy (1963) – Dienstmann
 Die ganze Welt ist himmelblau (1964) – Gutschober 
 A Fistful of Dollars (1964) – Piripero
 Massacre at Marble City (1964) – Fishbury
 Liebesgrüße aus Tirol (1964) – Onkel Sebastian Holl
 Ein Ferienbett mit 100 PS (1965) – Zulassungsbeamter
 Black Eagle of Santa Fe (1965) – Buddy 
 For a Few Dollars More (1965) – Old Prophet (final film role)

References

External links
 

1889 births
1966 deaths
20th-century Austrian male actors
Austrian male film actors
Male Western (genre) film actors
Male Spaghetti Western actors